The Baltic states or the Baltic countries is a geopolitical term, which currently is used to group three countries: Estonia, Latvia, and Lithuania. All three countries are members of NATO, the European Union, the Eurozone, and the OECD. The three sovereign states on the eastern coast of the Baltic Sea are sometimes referred to as the "Baltic nations", less often and in historical circumstances also as the "Baltic republics", the "Baltic lands", or simply the Baltics. 

All three Baltic countries are classified as high-income economies by the World Bank and maintain a very high Human Development Index. The three governments engage in intergovernmental and parliamentary cooperation. There is also frequent cooperation in foreign and security policy, defence, energy, and transportation.

History

Summary

After the First World War (1914–1918) the term "Baltic states" came to refer to countries by the Baltic Sea that had gained independence from the former Russian Empire. The term included Estonia, Latvia and Lithuania, and originally also Finland, which more recently has become grouped among the Nordic countries.

The greater part of the three modern Baltic states' territory was for the first time included in the same political entity when the Russian Empire expanded in the 18th century. Estonia and northern part of Latvia were ceded by Sweden, and incorporated into the Russian Empire at the end of the Great Northern War in 1721, while most of the territory of what is now Lithuania came under Russian rule after the Third Partition of Polish–Lithuanian Commonwealth in 1795. Large parts of the Baltic countries were controlled by the Russian central government until the 1917 Russian Revolution and the final stages of World War I in 1918, when Estonia, Latvia and Lithuania gained their sovereignty. The three countries were independent until the outbreak of World War II. In 1940, all three countries were invaded, occupied and annexed by the Stalinist Soviet Union. 1941 saw the invasion and occupation of Lithuania, Latvia and Estonia by Nazi Germany, before the Red Army re-conquered the territory in 1944–1945, after which the Soviet Union maintained control over the three countries until 1991. Soviet rule ended in the Baltic countries in 1989–1991, as the newly elected parliaments of the three nations declared the Soviet occupation illegal, culminating with the full restoration of the independence of the three countries in August 1991.

The first period of independence, 1918–1940

As World War I came to a close, Lithuania declared independence and Latvia formed a provisional government. Estonia had already obtained autonomy from tsarist Russia in 1917, and declared independence in February 1918, but was subsequently occupied by the German Empire until November 1918. Estonia fought a successful war of independence against Soviet Russia in 1918–1920. Latvia and Lithuania followed a similar process, until the completion of the Latvian War of Independence and Lithuanian Wars of Independence in 1920.

 
During the interwar period the three countries as well as Finland and Poland sometimes were collectively referred to as limitrophe states (from French language), as they together formed a "rim" along the western border of Soviet Russia and the Soviet Union. They were also part of what Georges Clemenceau considered a strategic cordon sanitaire, the entire territory from Finland in the north to Romania in the south, between Western and Central Europe and potential Bolshevik territorial ambitions.

All three Baltic countries experienced a period of authoritarian rule by a head of state who had come to power after a bloodless coup: Antanas Smetona in Lithuania (1926–1940), Kārlis Ulmanis in Latvia (1934–1940), and Konstantin Päts during the "era of silence" (1934–1938) in Estonia, respectively. Some emphasise that the events in Lithuania differed from the other two countries, with Smetona having different motivations as well as securing power eight years before any such events in Latvia or Estonia took place. Despite considerable political turmoil in Finland, no such authoritarian figure took power there. It had, however, been embroiled in a bloody civil war back in 1918, something that had not happened in the Baltic states. Some controversy surrounds the Baltic authoritarian régimes – due to the general stability and rapid economic growth of the period (even if brief), some commenters avoid the label "authoritarian"; others, however, condemn such an "apologetic" attitude, for example in later assessments of Kārlis Ulmanis.

Soviet and German occupations, 1940–1991

In accordance with a secret protocol within the Molotov–Ribbentrop Pact of 1939 that divided Europe into German and Soviet spheres of influence, the Soviet Army invaded eastern Poland in September 1939, and the Stalinist Soviet government coerced Estonia, Latvia, and Lithuania into "mutual assistance treaties" which granted USSR the right to establish military bases in these countries. In June 1940, the Red Army occupied all of the territory of Estonia, Latvia, and Lithuania, and installed new, pro-Soviet puppet governments. In all three countries simultaneously, rigged elections (in which only pro-Stalinist candidates were allowed to run) were staged in July 1940, the newly assembled "parliaments" in each of the three countries then unanimously applied to join the Soviet Union, and in August 1940 were incorporated into the USSR as the Estonian SSR, Latvian SSR, and Lithuanian SSR.

Repressions, executions and mass deportations followed after that in the Baltics. The Soviet Union attempted to Sovietize its occupied territories, by means such as deportations and instituting the Russian language as the only working language. Between 1940 and 1953, the Soviet government deported more than 200,000 people from the Baltics to remote locations in the Soviet Union. In addition, at least 75,000 were sent to Gulags. About 10% of the adult Baltic population were deported or sent to labor camps. (See June deportation, Soviet deportations from Estonia, Sovietization of the Baltic states)

The Soviet occupation of the Baltic countries was interrupted by Nazi German invasion of the region in 1941. Initially, many Estonians, Latvians, and Lithuanians considered the German army as liberators, while having hoped for the restoration of each of the three countries' independence, but instead the Nazi German invaders established a civil administration, known as the Reichskommissariat Ostland. During the occupation the Nazi authorities carried out ghettoisations and mass killings of the Jewish populations in Lithuania and Latvia. Over 190,000 Lithuanian Jews, nearly 95% of Lithuania's pre-war Jewish community, and 66,000 Latvian Jews were murdered. The German occupation lasted until late 1944 (in Courland, until early 1945), when the countries were reoccupied by the Red Army and Soviet rule was re-established, with the passive agreement of the United States and Britain (see Yalta Conference and Potsdam Agreement).

The forced collectivisation of agriculture began in 1947, and was completed after the mass deportation in March 1949 (see Operation Priboi). Private farms were confiscated, and farmers were made to join the collective farms. In all three countries, Baltic partisans, known colloquially as the Forest Brothers, Latvian national partisans, and Lithuanian partisans, waged unsuccessful guerrilla warfare against the Soviet occupation for the next eight years in a bid to regain their nations' independence. The armed resistance of the anti-Soviet partisans lasted up to 1953. Although the armed resistance was defeated, the population remained anti-Soviet.

Lithuania, Latvia and Estonia were considered to be under Soviet occupation by the United States, the United Kingdom, Canada, NATO, and many other countries and international organizations. During the Cold War, Lithuania and Latvia maintained legations in Washington DC, while Estonia had a mission in New York City. Each was staffed initially by diplomats from the last governments before USSR occupation.

Restoration of independence
In the late 1980s, a massive campaign of civil resistance against Soviet rule, known as the Singing revolution, began. On 23 August 1989, the Baltic Way, a two-million-strong human chain, stretched for 600 km from Tallinn to Vilnius. In the wake of this campaign, Gorbachev's government had privately concluded that the departure of the Baltic republics had become "inevitable". This process contributed to the dissolution of the Soviet Union, setting a precedent for the other Soviet republics to secede from the USSR. The Soviet Union recognized the independence of three Baltic states on 6 September 1991. Troops were withdrawn from the region (starting from Lithuania) from August 1993. The last Russian troops were withdrawn from there in August 1994. Skrunda-1, the last Russian military radar in the Baltics, officially suspended operations in August 1998.

21st century

All three are today liberal democracies, with unicameral parliaments elected by popular vote for four-year terms: Riigikogu in Estonia, Saeima in Latvia and Seimas in Lithuania. In Latvia and Estonia, the president is elected by parliament, while Lithuania has a semi-presidential system whereby the president is elected by popular vote. All are part of the European Union (EU) and members of the North Atlantic Treaty Organization (NATO).

Each of the three countries has declared itself to be the restoration of the sovereign nation that had existed from 1918 to 1940, emphasizing their contention that Soviet domination over the Baltic states during the Cold War period had been an illegal occupation and annexation.

The same legal interpretation is shared by the United States, the United Kingdom, and most other Western democracies, who held the forcible incorporation of Estonia, Latvia, and Lithuania into the Soviet Union to be illegal. At least formally, most Western democracies never considered the three Baltic states to be constituent parts of the Soviet Union. Australia was a brief exception to this support of Baltic independence: in 1974, the Labor government of Australia did recognize Soviet dominion, but this decision was reversed by the next Australian Parliament. Other exceptions included Sweden, which was the first Western country, and one of the very few to ever do so, to recognize the incorporation of the Baltic states into the Soviet Union as lawful.

After the Baltic states had restored their independence, integration with Western Europe became a major strategic goal. In 2002, the Baltic governments applied to join the European Union and become members of NATO. All three became NATO members on 29 March 2004, and joined the EU on 1 May 2004.

Regional cooperation

During the Baltic struggle for independence 1989–1992, a personal friendship developed between the (at that time unrecognized) Baltic ministers of foreign affairs and the Nordic ministers of foreign affairs. This friendship led to the creation of the Council of the Baltic Sea States in 1992, and the EuroFaculty in 1993.

Between 1994 and 2004, the BAFTA free trade agreement was established to help prepare the countries for their accession to the EU, rather than out of the Baltic states' desire to trade among themselves. The Baltic countries were more interested in gaining access to the rest of the European market.

Currently, the governments of the Baltic states cooperate in multiple ways, including cooperation among presidents, parliament speakers, heads of government, and foreign ministers. On 8 November 1991, the Baltic Assembly, which includes 15 to 20 MPs from each parliament, was established to facilitate inter-parliamentary cooperation. The Baltic Council of Ministers was established on 13 June 1994 to facilitate intergovernmental cooperation. Since 2003, there is coordination between the two organizations.

Compared with other regional groupings in Europe, such as the Nordic Council or Visegrád Group, Baltic cooperation is rather limited. All three countries are also members of the New Hanseatic League, an informal group of northern EU states formed to advocate a common fiscal position.

Economies

Economically, parallel with political changes and a transition to democracy – as a rule of law states – the nations' previous command economies were transformed via the legislation into market economies, and set up or renewed the major macroeconomic factors: budgetary rules, national audit, national currency and central bank. Generally, they shortly encountered the following problems: high inflation, high unemployment, low economic growth and high government debt. The inflation rate, in the examined area, relatively quickly dropped to below 5% by 2000. Meanwhile, these economies were stabilised, and in 2004 all of them joined the European Union. New macroeconomic requirements have arisen for them; the Maastricht criteria became obligatory and later the Stability and Growth Pact set stricter rules through national legislation by implementing the regulations and directives of the Sixpack, because the financial crisis was a shocking milestone.

All three countries are member states of the European Union, and the Eurozone. They are classified as high-income economies by the World Bank and maintain high Human Development Index. Estonia, Latvia, and Lithuania are also members of the OECD.
Estonia adopted the euro currency in January 2011, Latvia in January 2014, and Lithuania in January 2015.

Energy security of Baltic states
Usually the concept of energy security is related to the uninterruptible supply, sufficient energy storage, advanced technological development of energy sector and environmental regulations. Other studies add other indicators to this list: diversification of energy suppliers, energy import dependence and vulnerability of political system.

Even now being a part of the European Union, Estonia, Latvia and Lithuania are still considered as the most vulnerable EU member states in the energy sphere. Due to their Soviet past, Baltic states have several gas pipelines on their territories coming from Russia. Moreover, several routes of oil delivery also have been sustained from Soviet times: These are ports in Ventspils, Butinge and Tallinn. Therefore, Estonia, Latvia and Lithuania play a significant role not only in consuming, but also in distribution of Russian energy fuels extracting transaction fees. So, the overall EU dependence on the Russia's energy supplies from the one hand and the need of Baltic states to import energy fuels from their closer hydrocarbon-rich neighbor creates a tension that could jeopardize the energy security of Estonia, Latvia and Lithuania.

As a part of the EU from 2004, Baltic states must comply with the EU's regulations in energy, environmental and security spheres. One of the most important documents that the EU applied to improve the energy security stance of the Baltic states are European Union climate and energy package, including the Climate and Energy Strategy 2020, that aims to reduce the greenhouse emissions to 20%, increase the energy production from renewables for 20% in overall share and 20% energy efficiency development.

The calculations take into account not only economic, but also technological and energy-related factors: Energy and carbon intensity of transport and households, trade balance of total energy, energy import dependency, diversification of energy mix, etc. It was stated that from 2008, Baltic states experiences a positive change in their energy security score. They diversified their oil import suppliers due to shutdown of Druzhba gas pipeline in 2006 and increased the share of renewable sources in total energy production with the help of the EU policies.

Estonia usually was the best performing country in terms of energy security, but new assessment shows that even though Estonia has the highest share of renewables in the energy production, its energy economy has been still characterized by high rates of carbon intensity. Lithuania, in contrast, achieved the best results on carbon intensity of economy but its energy dependence level is still very high. Latvia performed the best according to all indicators. Especially, the high share of renewables were introduced to the energy production of Latvia, that can be explained by the state's geographical location and favorable natural conditions.

Possible threats to energy security include, firstly, a major risk of energy supply disruption. Even if there are several electricity interconnectors that connect the area with electricity-rich states (Estonia-Finland interconnector, Lithuania-Poland interconnector, Lithuania-Sweden interconnector), the pipeline supply of natural gas and tanker supply of oil are unreliable without modernization of energy infrastructure. Secondly, the dependence on single supplier – Russia – is not healthy both for economics and politics. As it was in 2009 during the Russian-Ukrainian gas dispute, when states of Eastern Europe were deprived from access to the natural gas deliveries, the reoccurrence of the situation may again lead to economic, political and social crisis. Therefore, the diversification of suppliers is needed. Finally, the low technological enhancement results in slow adaptation of new technologies, such as construction and use of renewable sources of energy. This also poses a threat to energy security of the Baltic states, because slows down the renewable energy consumption and lead to low rates of energy efficiency.

Culture

Ethnic groups

Estonians are Finnic people, together with the nearby Finns. The Latvians and Lithuanians, linguistically and culturally related to each other, are Baltic Indo-European people. In Latvia exists a small community of Finnic people related to the Estonians, composed of only 250 people, known as Livonians, and they live in the so-called Livonian Coast. The peoples in the Baltic states have together inhabited the eastern coast of the Baltic Sea for millennia, although not always peacefully in ancient times, over which period their populations, Estonian, Latvian, and Lithuanian, have remained remarkably stable within the approximate territorial boundaries of the current Baltic states. While separate peoples with their own customs and traditions, historical factors have introduced cultural similarities in and differences within them.

The populations of each Baltic country belong to several Christian denominations, a reflection of historical circumstances. Both Western and Eastern Christianity had been introduced by the end of the first millennium. The current divide between Lutheranism to the north and Catholicism to the south is the remnant of Swedish and Polish hegemony, respectively, with Orthodox Christianity remaining the dominant religion among Russian and other East Slavic minorities.

The Baltic states have historically been in many different spheres of influence, from Danish over Swedish and Polish–Lithuanian, to German (Hansa and Holy Roman Empire), and before independence in the Russian sphere of influence.

The Baltic states are inhabited by several ethnic minorities: in Latvia: 33.0% (including 25.4% Russian, 3.3% Belarusian, 2.2% Ukrainian, and 2.1% Polish), in Estonia: 27.6% and in Lithuania: 12.2% (including 5.6% Polish and 4.5% Russian).

The Soviet Union conducted a policy of Russification by encouraging Russians and other Russian-speaking ethnic groups of the Soviet Union to settle in the Baltics. Today, ethnic Russian immigrants from the former Soviet Union and their descendants make up a sizable particularly in Latvia (about one-quarter of the total population and close to one-half in the capital Riga) and Estonia (nearly one-quarter of the total population).

Because the three countries had been independent nations prior to their occupation by the Soviet Union, there was a strong feeling of national identity (often labeled "bourgeois nationalism" by the Communist Party) and popular resentment towards the imposed Soviet rule in the three countries, in combination with Soviet cultural policy, which employed superficial multiculturalism (in order for the Soviet Union to appear as a multinational union based on the free will of its peoples) in limits allowed by the communist "internationalist" (but in effect pro-Russification) ideology and under tight control of the Communist Party (those of the Baltic nationals who crossed the line were called "bourgeois nationalists" and repressed). This let Estonians, Latvians and Lithuanians preserve a high degree of Europe-oriented national identity. In Soviet times this made them appear as the "West" of the Soviet Union in the cultural and political sense, thus as close to emigration a Russian could get without leaving the USSR.

Languages
The languages of the three Baltic peoples belong to two distinct language families. The Latvian and Lithuanian languages belong to the Indo-European language family and are the only extant (widely recognized) members of the Baltic language group (or more specifically, Eastern Baltic subgroup of Baltic). Latgalian and Samogitian are considered either separate languages or dialects of Latvian and Lithuanian, respectively.

The Estonian language (including its divergent Võro and Seto dialects) is a Finnic language, together with neighboring Finland's Finnish language. It is also related to the now near-extinct Livonian language spoken as a second language by a few dozen people in Latvia.

Apart from the indigenous languages, German was the dominant language in Estonia and Latvia in academics, professional life, and upper society from the 13th century until World War I. Polish served a similar function in Lithuania. Numerous Swedish loanwords have made it into the Estonian language; it was under the Swedish rule that schools were established and education propagated in the 17th century. Swedish remains spoken in Estonia, particularly the Estonian Swedish dialect of the Estonian Swedes of northern Estonia and the islands (though many fled to Sweden as the USSR invaded and re-occupied Estonia in 1944). There is also significant proficiency in Finnish in Estonia owing to its linguistic relationship with Estonian and also widespread exposure to Finnish broadcasts during the Soviet era. 

Russian was the most commonly studied foreign language at all levels of schooling during the period of Soviet rule in 1944–1991. Despite schooling available and administration conducted in local languages, Russian-speaking settlers were neither encouraged nor motivated to learn the official local languages, so knowledge of some Russian became a practical necessity in daily life in Russian-dominated urban areas. As a result, even to this day most of the three countries' middle age and senior population can understand and speak some Russian, especially people aged over 50 years who went to school during the Soviet rule. The question of assimilation, or integration, of the Russian-speaking immigrants is a major factor in current social and diplomatic affairs. -->

Since the decline of Russian influence and integration into the European Union economy, English has become the most popular second language in the Baltic states. Although Russian is more widely spoken among older people the vast majority of young people are learning English instead with as many as 80 percent of young Lithuanians professing English proficiency, and similar trends in the other Baltic states.

Baltic Romani is spoken by the Roma.

Etymology of the word Baltic

The term Baltic stems from the name of the Baltic Sea – a hydronym dating back to at least 3rd century B.C. (when Erastothenes mentioned  in an Ancient Greek text) and possibly earlier. There are several theories about its origin, most of which trace it to the reconstructed Proto-Indo-European root *bhel meaning 'white, fair'. However, the modern names of the region and the sea that originate from this root, were not used in either of the two languages prior to the 19th century.

Indeed, the Baltic Sea lies mostly to the east of Germany, Denmark, Norway, and Sweden. The term was also used historically to refer to Baltic Dominions of the Swedish Empire and, subsequently, the Baltic governorates of the Russian Empire. Terms related to modern name Baltic appear in ancient texts, but had fallen into disuse until reappearing as the adjective  in German, from which it was adopted in other languages. During the 19th century, Baltic started to supersede  as the name for the region. Officially, its Russian equivalent  was first used in 1859.

The term Baltic countries (or lands, or states) was, until the early 20th century, used in the context of countries neighbouring the Baltic Sea: Sweden and Denmark, sometimes also Germany and the Russian Empire. With the advent of Foreningen Norden (the Nordic Associations), the term was no longer used for Sweden and Denmark. After World War I, the new sovereign states that emerged on the east coast of the Baltic Sea – Estonia, Latvia, Lithuania, and Finland – became known as the Baltic states. Since World War II the term has typically been used to group the three countries Estonia, Latvia, and Lithuania.

Geography

Nature

Current leaders

General statistics
All three unitary republics, which simultaneously joined the European Union on 1 May 2004, share EET/EEST time zone schedules and the euro currency.

See also

 Baltics deportations:
 Soviet deportation from the Baltics in 1941
 Soviet deportation from the Baltics in 1949
 Soviet deportations from Estonia
 Soviet deportations from Latvia
 Soviet deportations from Lithuania
 Ethnic cleansing in the Baltics
 German occupation of Estonia during World War II
German occupation of Latvia during World War II
German occupation of Lithuania during World War II

Notes

References

Further reading

 
 
 Clerc, Louis; Glover, Nikolas; Jordan, Paul, eds. Histories of Public Diplomacy and Nation Branding in the Nordic and Baltic Countries: Representing the Periphery (Leiden: Brill Nijhoff, 2015). 348 pp. . for an online book review see online review
 
 
 
 
 
 
 Malowist, M. “The Economic and Social Development of the Baltic Countries from the Fifteenth to the Seventeenth Centuries.” Economic History Review 12#2 1959, pp. 177–189. online
 
 
 
 
 
 
 
 Palmer, Alan. The Baltic: A new history of the region and its people (New York: Overlook Press, 2006; published in London with the title  Northern shores: a history of the Baltic Sea and its peoples (John Murray, 2006))
 
 Vilkauskaite, Dovile O. "From Empire to Independence: The Curious Case of the Baltic States 1917-1922." (thesis, University of Connecticut, 2013). online; Bibliography pp 70 – 75.

International peer-reviewed media
 On the Boundary of Two Worlds: Identity, Freedom, and Moral Imagination in the Baltics (book series)
 Journal of Baltic Studies, journal of the Association for the Advancement of Baltic Studies (AABS)
 Lituanus, a journal dedicated to Lithuanian and Baltic art, history, language, literature and related cultural topics
 The Baltic Course, International Internet Magazine. Analysis and background information on Baltic markets
 Baltic Reports , English-language daily news website that covers all three Baltic states
 The Baltic Review, the independent newspaper from the Baltics
 The Baltic Times, an independent weekly newspaper that covers the latest political, economic, business, and cultural events in Estonia, Latvia and Lithuania
 The Baltics Today, news about The Baltics

External links

 The Baltic Sea Information Centre
 vifanord – a digital library that provides scientific information on the Nordic and Baltic countries
 Baltic states – The article about Baltic states on Encyclopædia Britannica.
 Richter, Klaus: Baltic States and Finland, in: 1914-1918-online. International Encyclopedia of the First World War.

Official statistics of the Baltic states
 Statistics Estonia
 Statistics Latvia
 Statistics Lithuania

 
States
Geography of Eastern Europe
Geography of Northern Europe
Regions of Europe
Regions of Eurasia
Bottom-up regional groups within the European Union